Cape Coast Metropolitan Assembly is one of the twenty-two districts in Central Region, Ghana. Originally created as a municipal district assembly in 1988 when it was known as Cape Coast Municipal District, which was created from the Cape Coast Municipal Council; until it was later elevated to metropolitan district assembly status on 29 February 2008 to become Cape Coast Metropolitan District. The municipality is located in the southwest part of Central Region and has Cape Coast as its capital town; which is also the regional capital of the Central Region.

Geography

Boundaries
Cape Coast Metropolitan Assembly is bordered by the Gulf of Guinea to the south, Komenda/Edina/Eguafo/Abirem Municipal District to the west, Abura/Asebu/Kwamankese District to the east and Twifo/Heman/Lower Denkyira District to the north.

List of settlements

Sources
 
 Districts: Cape Coast Metropolitan Assembly

References

Central Region (Ghana)
Districts of the Central Region (Ghana)